The Oxford metropolitan area may refer to:

The Oxford metropolitan area, England
The Oxford, North Carolina micropolitan area, United States
The Oxford, Mississippi micropolitan area, United States

See also
Oxford (disambiguation)